The Lohman Block is a site on the National Register of Historic Places located in Chinook, Montana. It was added to the register on March 19, 1980. The building previously housed a department store. 

The building is named for businessman and rancher Andrew S. Lohman who built the block. Originally a general merchandise store, with living quarters, the 1910 two-storey addition added several other businesses. The large brick building spurred commercial growth in early Chinook.

References

Commercial buildings on the National Register of Historic Places in Montana
National Register of Historic Places in Blaine County, Montana
1900 establishments in Montana
Commercial buildings completed in 1900